Mala noćna panika (Little Night Panic) is the second and final studio album by the Serbian new wave band Bulevar, released by PGP RTB in 1982. The album was remastered and released on CD in 2008 on the compilation album Nestašni dečaci by PGP RTS, the successor of PGP RTB.

Track listing

Personnel

Bulevar
 Dejan Cukić — vocals, backing vocals, music by (track 1, 5), lyrics by (track 1, 4, 5), arranged by (track 9)
 Branko Isaković — bass,
 Nenad Stamatović — guitar, backing vocals, music by (tracks 2, 3, 5, 7, 9, 10)
 Predrag Jakovljević — drums,
 Dragan Mitrić — keyboards, music by (track 5, 8), lyrics by (track 8)

Additional personnel
 Jugoslav Vlahović — artwork by [design]
 Zoran Konjević — backing vocals
 Kornelije Kovač — producer, backing vocals
 Marina Tucaković — lyrics by (tracks: 2, 3, 5, 9, 9, 10)
 Rade Ercegovac — recorded by [vocals]
 Tahir Durkalić — recorded by

References

 EX YU ROCK enciklopedija 1960-2006, Janjatović Petar;

External links
 Mala noćna panika at Discogs

1982 albums
Bulevar (band) albums
PGP-RTB albums